Optical Materials is a peer-reviewed scientific journal that publishes original papers and review articles on the design, synthesis, characterisation and applications of materials, suitable for various optical devices. The journal also publishes papers about physical and chemical properties of such materials and their applications.

Abstracting and indexing
Optical Materials is abstracted and indexed in the following databases:
Chemical Abstracts Service
Current Contents/Engineering, Computing & Technology
Compendex/Engineering Index
Inspec
Scopus

References

External links
 

Optics journals
Monthly journals
Publications established in 1992
Elsevier academic journals
English-language journals